Eilema rubrescens is a moth in the subfamily Arctiinae first described by George Hampson in 1909. It is found in Taiwan.

References

Moths described in 1909
rubrescens